Alessio Bugno (born 27 March 1990) is an Italian footballer who plays for ASD Romentinese Cerano. He is the son of the cyclist Gianni Bugno, World Champion in the 90s.

Biography
Born in Magenta, Lombardy, Bugno was loaned to AlbinoLeffe in January 2008 from Renate. In January 2009 he left for Lega Pro Seconda Divisione club Pro Sesto. In August 2010 he left for Prima Divisione club Monza as a free agent where he played most of the time as a left back or left midfielder. At the end of the season Bugno decided to leave Monza as he had offers from Serie B teams in Italy. However, he rejected the Serie B offers and instead on 5 July 2012 joined English league 1 side Carlisle United on a trial. On 27 July in a match against St Mirren, Bugno earned himself a standing ovation from the fans.

On 1 August 2012 Bugno signed a two-year deal with Carlisle United. Fans of Carlisle are already making him a fan favourite for his attacking style of play shown in pre-season. Alessio made his professional debut on 11 August 2012 in a 1–0 win against Accrington Stanley in the Football League Cup.

On 11 December 2012 it was revealed that Alessio was unhappy with life at Carlisle and had flown back to Italy to consider his future.

On 31 January 2013. It was revealed that Alessio had parted ways with Carlisle United upon mutual agreement and signed again with his former club Monza At the end of the season, expired the contract, signature with the Lecco.

Ahead of the 2019–20 season, Bugno joined Italian club Romentinese Cerano & C. of Galliate.

References

External links
 Monza Profile 
 LaSerieD.com Profile 
 Football.it Football.it Profile 
 
 

1990 births
Living people
People from Magenta, Lombardy
Italian footballers
Italian expatriate footballers
U.C. AlbinoLeffe players
S.S.D. Pro Sesto players
A.C. Monza players
Carlisle United F.C. players
Calcio Lecco 1912 players
Serie C players
Serie D players
Association football fullbacks
Italian expatriate sportspeople in England
Expatriate footballers in England
Footballers from Lombardy
Sportspeople from the Metropolitan City of Milan